Mrisho is a Tanzanian name. Notable people with the name include:

Mrisho Gambo, Tanzanian politician
Mrisho Ngasa (born 1989), Tanzanian football player
Zakia Mrisho Mohamed (born 1984), Tanzanian long-distance runner

African given names